May 20 - Eastern Orthodox Church calendar - May 22

All fixed commemorations below celebrated on June 3 by Orthodox Churches on the Old Calendar.

For May 21st, Orthodox Churches on the Old Calendar commemorate the Saints listed on May 8.

Saints
 Holy Equals-to-the-Apostles Emperor Constantine (337), and Empress Helena, his mother (327)
 Martyrs Polyeuctus, Victorinus, and Donatus, at Caesarea in Cappadocia.
 Hieromartyr Secundus and those with him, in Alexandria (356)
 Saint Adelphios, Bishop of Onouphis, in Byzantine Egypt (c. 362, or c. 431)
 Saint Boros, monk.
 Saint Christopher I, Patriarch of Antioch (967)

Pre-Schism Western saints
 Hieromartyrs Timothy, Polius and Eutychius, deacons, in Mauretania Caesariensis (Morocco).
 Hieromartyr Valens and Companions, Bishop who was martyred in Auxerre in France along with three children.
 Martyr Secundinus, in Cordoba in Spain under Diocletian (c. 306)
 Saint Hospitius the Hermit of Nice, Wonderworker (581)
 Saint Barrfoin (Bairrfhionn, Barrindus) of Killbarron (6th century)
 Saint Gollen (Collen, Colan) of Denbighshire, a saint who has given his name to Llangollen in Wales (7th century)
 Saint Isberga (Itisberga) of Aire, reputed sister of Charlemagne, nun at Aire (Aria) in the Artois, of which she is the patroness (c. 800)
 Saint Ageranus (Ayran, Ayrman) of Beze, a monk at Bèze in France, martyred by the Vikings (888)
 Saint Theobald (Thibaud), Archbishop of Vienne (970-1001)

Post-Schism Orthodox saints
 Blessed Constantine (Yaroslav), prince, and his children Michael and Theodore, Wonderworkers of Murom (1129)
 Saint Cyril II (Kirill), Bishop of Rostov (1262)
 Saint Basil of Ryazan, Bishop (1295)
 Saint Helen of Decani, Serbia, Princess (c. 1350)
 Venerable Cassian the Greek, monk of Uglich, Wonderworker (1504)
 Saint Agapitus of Markushev (Vologda) the Hieromartyr, Abbot (1584)
 Saint Constantine the Fool-for-Christ, of Novotorzanin, Russia  (c. 16th century)
 New Martyrs King Constantine Brancoveanu of Wallachia and his four sons Constantine, Stephen, Radu, and Matthew, and his counsellor Ianache (1714)
 Martyr Pachomios of Patmos (1730)

New martyrs and confessors
 Synaxis of Hieromartyrs of Karelia.
 Synaxis of Hieromartyrs of Ufa.

Other commemorations
 Uncovering of the relics (1998) of St. Andrew Ogorodnikov, fool-for-Christ of Simbirsk (1841)
 Repose of Elena Pavlova of Chepel, Kharkov (1885)
 Repose of Elder Isaac of Dionysiou Monastery of Mount Athos (1932)
 The Anastenaria fire-walking ritual is performed from May 21–23 in some villages in Northern Greece and Southern Bulgaria, coinciding with the feast of Constantine and Helen.

Icons
 Synaxis of the "Vladimir" Icon of the Most Holy Theotokos (1521)
 Synaxis of the "Virgin of Tenderness" Icon of the Most Holy Theotokos from Pskov-Pechersk (1524)

Icon gallery

Notes

References

Sources 
 May 21/June 3. Orthodox Calendar (ORTHOCHRISTIAN.COM).
 June 3 / May 21. HOLY TRINITY RUSSIAN ORTHODOX CHURCH (A parish of the Patriarchate of Moscow).
 Dr. Alexander Roman. May. Calendar of Ukrainian Orthodox Saints (Ukrainian Orthodoxy - Українське Православ'я).
 May 21. Latin Saints of the Orthodox Patriarchate of Rome.
 May 21. The Roman Martyrology.
Greek Sources
 Great Synaxaristes:  21 ΜΑΪΟΥ. ΜΕΓΑΣ ΣΥΝΑΞΑΡΙΣΤΗΣ.
  Συναξαριστής. 21 Μαΐου. ECCLESIA.GR. (H ΕΚΚΛΗΣΙΑ ΤΗΣ ΕΛΛΑΔΟΣ). 
Russian Sources
  3 июня (21 мая). Православная Энциклопедия под редакцией Патриарха Московского и всея Руси Кирилла (электронная версия). (Orthodox Encyclopedia - Pravenc.ru).
  21 мая (ст.ст.) 3 июня 2013 (нов. ст.). Русская Православная Церковь Отдел внешних церковных связей. (DECR).

May in the Eastern Orthodox calendar